Manishtushu (Ma-an-ish-tu-su) was the third king of the Akkadian Empire, reigning 15 years from c. 2270 BC until his assassination in 2255 BC (Middle Chronology). He was the son of Sargon the Great, the founder of the Akkadian Empire, and he was succeeded by his son, Naram-Sin.

Biography 
Manishtushu was the third king of the Akkadian Empire. He was the son of Sargon of Akkad and Queen Tashlultum, brother of Enheduanna, Rimush, and Shu-Enlil, and the father of Naram-Sin.

He became king in c. 2270 BC after the death of his brother Rimush. Manishtushu, freed of the rebellions of his brother's reign, led campaigns to distant lands. According to a passage from one of his inscriptions, he led a fleet down the Persian Gulf where 32 kings allied to fight him. Manishtushu was victorious and consequently looted their cities and silver mines, along with other expeditions to kingdoms along the Persian Gulf. He also sailed a fleet down the Tigris River that eventually traded with 37 other nations, conquered the city of Shirasum in Elam, and rebuilt the destroyed temple of Inanna in Nineveh in c. 2260 BC. In Elam and Pashime, in the coastal area of Iran, Manishtushu had governors installed for the Akkadian Empire: Eshpum was in charge of Elam, while Ilshu-rabi was in charge of Pashime.

In c. 2255 BC Manishtushu died, assassinated by members of his own court, and was succeeded by his son Naram-Sin. A pyramidal stele erected by Manishtushu bearing a long cuneiform inscription in Akkadian is featured in the Louvre.

He held the title "King of Kish" in some of his inscriptions.

Manishtushu trampling enemies
A probable statue of Manishtushu discovered in Susa, Elam, shows him trampling vanquished enemies. It was among other Akkadian Empire statues taken there in the 12th century BC by Elamite  king  Shutruk-Nahhunte. There are inscriptions on the bodies of the enemies, identifying them. The statue is in the Louvre Museum (Sb 48).

Other artifacts

See also

History of Sumer
Sumerian king list
Manishtushu Obelisk
List of kings of Akkad

References

23rd-century BC kings of Akkad
Akkadian people
Sumerian kings
Ancient murdered monarchs
23rd-century BC deaths
Year of birth unknown
Akkadian Empire